Péter Fülöp Kocsis (born 13 January 1963 in Szeged, Hungary) is a Hungarian Greek Catholic archbishop. He is as metropolitan archbishop of the Archeparchy of Hajdúdorog, the head of the Hungarian Greek Catholic Church.

Biography
Metropolitan Fülöp studied philosophy and theology at the Saint Athanasius Greek Catholic Theological Institute in Nyíregyháza, Hungary and pedagogy and psychology at the Pontifical Salesian University in Rome, Italy. He was ordained priest in 1989. He served as cathecist at a Greek Catholic primary school in Nyíregyháza, than became parish pastor in Tornabarakony. Between 1995 and 1999 he received monastic formation as novice at the bi-ritual Benedictine monastery of Chevetogne. He was tonsured a monk in 1998 in 6 November 1998 by Bishop Szilárd Keresztes of Hajdúdorog receiving his monastic name, Fülöp (Philip). After the retirement of Bishop Szilárd Keresztes, Pope Benedict XVI appointed him to be Bishop of Hajdúdorog and apostolic administrator of the Apostolic Exarchate of Miskolc in 2008. He was consecrated bishop on 30 June 2008 at the Cathedral of Hajdúdorog. The principal consecrator was Bishop Emeritus Szilárd Keresztes, principal co-consecrators were Metropolitan Archbishop Ján Babjak SJ of Presov and Bishop Milan Šašik CM of Munkachevo.

In March 2015 Pope Francis elevated the Eparchy of Hajdúdorog to the rank of metropolitan archeparchy, with Fülöp Kocsis as its archbishop and head of the Hungarian Greek Catholic Church.

References

External links

 Péter Fülöp Kocsis at Catholic Hierarchy

Hungarian bishops
Hungarian Eastern Catholics
1963 births
Living people
People from Szeged
Salesian Pontifical University alumni
21st-century Eastern Catholic bishops
Archbishops of the Hungarian Greek Catholic Church